Edward Cowles may refer to:
 Edward Cowles (psychiatrist) (1836/37–1919), American psychiatrist
 Edward Spencer Cowles (1879–1954), American physician
 Edward Pitkin Cowles (1815–1874), justice of the Supreme Court of New York